The Competition may refer to:

The Competition (1980 film), a 1980 film starring Richard Dreyfuss
The Competition (2018 film), a 2018 film starring Thora Birch
The Competition (Dilbert episode), a Season One episode of the Dilbert animated series
The Competition, a season six episode of Sabrina, the Teenage Witch